Tang Liang (born 26 August 1985) is a Chinese ice hockey player who currently plays with the Shenzhen KRS Vanke Rays of the Women's Hockey League. 

Tang competed with the Chinese national team from 2003 to 2013, notably playing in the women's ice hockey tournament at the 2010 Winter Olympics and in the women's ice hockey tournament at the 2011 Asian Winter Games, where China won bronze.

References

External links

1985 births
Living people
Chinese women's ice hockey players
Sportspeople from Harbin
Shenzhen KRS Vanke Rays players
Ice hockey players at the 2010 Winter Olympics
Olympic ice hockey players of China
Asian Games medalists in ice hockey
Ice hockey players at the 2011 Asian Winter Games
Medalists at the 2011 Asian Winter Games
Asian Games bronze medalists for China